The Gamesters is a 1920 American silent drama film directed by George L. Cox and starring Margarita Fischer, Hayward Mack and Lee Shumway.

Cast
 Margarita Fischer as Rose 
 Hayward Mack as Jim Welch
 Lee Shumway as Marshall Andrews 
 P. Dempsey Tabler as Brad Bascom
 Evans Kirk as Paul Rosson
 Joseph Bennett as Harvey Blythe

References

Bibliography
 Darby, William. Masters of Lens and Light: A Checklist of Major Cinematographers and Their Feature Films. Scarecrow Press, 1991.
 Munden, Kenneth White. The American Film Institute Catalog of Motion Pictures Produced in the United States, Part 1. University of California Press, 1997.

External links
 

1920 films
1920 drama films
1920s English-language films
American silent feature films
Silent American drama films
American black-and-white films
Pathé Exchange films
Films directed by George L. Cox
1920s American films